Abdul Ghani bin Othman (Jawi: عبدالغاني بن عثمان; born 14 November 1946) served as the 14th Menteri Besar of Johor in Malaysia from 1995 to 2013. He is a member of the United Malays National Organisation (UMNO), a component party of Barisan Nasional (BN) coalition. He had held the political party position of Ledang Division Chairman, Johor State Liaison Chairman and national Supreme Council member in UMNO before. Currently, he serves as Chairman of Sime Darby Berhad, starting from 1 July 2013.

Early life and education
He received his primary education at Tangkak Boys School (Sekolah Laki-Laki Tangkak) before entering Muar High School (Sekolah Tinggi Muar). Qualifying for a Colombo Plan scholarship, Abdul Ghani furthered his studies at La Trobe University in Melbourne, Australia.  He graduated with a bachelor's degree in economics (Hons). Prior to returning to Malaysia, Abdul Ghani completed a master's degree in economics at the University of Queensland. Upon returning to his homeland, he joined the Economics Faculty of University Malaya (1974–1980) and within several years, was promoted to be the Dean of the School (1980–1984). In addition to that, he also served as Master of First College (Residential) for University of Malaya (1979 – 1984).

Political career
Abdul Ghani's political career began when he was first appointed to be a Senator (December 1984 - July 1986). This was followed by his election to the Federal Parliament in 1986 general election for  seat.

From May 1987 to November 1990, Abdul Ghani held the post of Deputy Minister for Energy, Telecommunication and Post. Subsequently, he was then given the portfolio of Deputy Minister of Finance from 1990 to 1993.

In December 1993, Abdul Ghani was promoted to become the Minister of Youth and Sports (1 December 1993 - March 1995). He immediately initiated a national youth program called 'Rakan Muda' (Young Friend), which helped mobilise Malaysian youths through healthy activities such as sports and cultural events.

In March 1995, Abdul Ghani was appointed to become the Menteri Besar of Johor and has held that position for the next 17 years.

During the 2013 Malaysian general election however, he was defeated in an upset result by Democratic Action Party (DAP) advisor Lim Kit Siang in Gelang Patah, Johor and was replaced by Mohamed Khaled Nordin as Menteri Besar for Johor.

Controversy

Bangsa Malaysia
Ghani did not agree with the Bangsa Malaysia concept and alleging that Bangsa Malaysia was a "nebulous concept" which overstepped the bounds of the Constitution. "Even if the term Bangsa Malaysia is to be used, it must only be applied in the context of all the peoples of Malaysia with the Malays as the pivotal race," he said.

Ghani insisted that those advocating Bangsa Malaysia were echoing Lee Kuan Yew's call for a Malaysian Malaysia made during the early 1960s when Singapore was a state in Malaysia, even though the campaign had been repudiated by the government.

After the 2006 UMNO Annual General Assembly, Ghani elaborated that his opposition to Bangsa Malaysia and Malaysian Malaysia was because:

Ghani defined his idea kenegaraan as "the idea that has united the Malays, and also the same idea that has given privileges to other races to be citizens, live together and share power and prosperity."

Election results

Honours and awards
The Sultan of Johor awarded Abdul Ghani the Order of the Crown of Johor; Setia Mahkota Johor (SMJ) medal in 1989 and the Royal Family Order of Johor; Darjah Kerabat Johor Yang Amat Dihormati Pangkat Kedua (D.K. II) in 1996. He was then conferred the Darjah Seri Paduka Mahkota Johor (SPMJ) in 2004, which carries the title Dato'.

On 9 April 2009, Sultan Iskandar bestowed upon Abdul Ghani the highest award in the State of Johor, DK (I). It is very rare for a commoner to receive such an award, which is normally given to royals.

Honours of Malaysia
  : 
 Commander of the Order of Loyalty to the Crown of Malaysia (PSM) – Tan Sri (2014)
  :
 Companion of the Order of the Crown of Johor (SMJ) (1989)
 Second Class of the Royal Family Order of Johor (DK II) (1996)
 Knight Grand Commander of the Order of the Crown of Johor (SPMJ) – Dato' (2004)
 First Class of the Sultan Ibrahim Medal (PIS I) (2008)
 First Class of the Royal Family Order of Johor (DK I) (2009)

References

External links
 Umno's Men-In-Waiting, 12 May 2000, Asiaweek

1946 births
Living people
People from Muar
People from Johor
Malaysian people of Malay descent
Malaysian Muslims
Malaysian expatriates in Australia
Malaysian chairpersons of corporations
United Malays National Organisation politicians
Members of the Dewan Negara
Members of the Dewan Rakyat
Members of the Johor State Legislative Assembly
Government ministers of Malaysia
Chief Ministers of Johor
Johor state executive councillors
University of Queensland alumni

Commanders of the Order of Loyalty to the Crown of Malaysia
First Classes of the Royal Family Order of Johor
Second Classes of the Royal Family Order of Johor
Knights Grand Commander of the Order of the Crown of Johor
La Trobe University alumni
Companions of the Order of the Crown of Johor